Tup Aghaj or Tupaghaj or Towp Aghaj may refer to:
 Tup Aghaj, East Azerbaijan
 Tup Aghaj, Kurdistan